Esther Mona Friesner-Stutzman, née Friesner (born July 16, 1951) is an American science fiction and fantasy author. She is also a poet and playwright.  She is best known for her humorous style of writing, both in the titles and the works themselves. This humor allows her to discuss with broader audiences about issues like gender equality and social justice.

Life
Friesner attended the Hunter College High School, a public magnet high school in New York City, as well as Vassar College. At Vassar, she completed B.A.s in both Spanish and Drama. While at Vassar, she became friendly with Paula Volsky and Jane Bishop. Together they wrote at least one film script for student production, "Lavinia: a Girl of the Street", which demonstrated Esther's trademark tongue-in-cheek style. She holds a Ph.D. in Spanish and was a college Spanish professor at Yale University before becoming a writer. She currently resides with her husband and two children in Connecticut.

Career
During her early career as a writer, Friesner penned an advice column entitled "Ask Auntie Esther" for Pulphouse Magazine. Her first short story, "The Stuff of Heroes" was sold in 1982.

In addition to short stories, Friesner has published a number of novels and is a prolific editor of anthologies. "Thunderbolt," a short story in Random House's Young Warriors anthology lead to her creation of her recent books Nobody's Princess, which takes the Greek legend of Helen of Sparta and gives it a new beginning, and its sequel, Nobody's Prize.

Alien Pregnant By Elvis was her first effort as an anthology editor as part of a collection of tabloid science fiction for DAW books in conjunction with Martin H. Greenberg. She also collaborated with Greenberg on an Amazonian comedy anthology for Baen Books entitled Chicks In Chainmail and a vampire anthology for Donald I Fine, Inc. called Blood Muse.

She is a frequent guest of honor at science fiction conventions, having appeared at Bubonicon, Arisia, Boskone, Baycon and Albacon in the 1990s and into the 21st century. Her story "Love's Eldritch Ichor" was featured at one of these conventions, the World Fantasy convention, in 1990.

Friesner is credited as one of the founders of a parody movement in the 1980s called cyberprep.

Awards
Friesner was named Outstanding New Fantasy Writer by Romantic Times in 1986. She won the Skylark Award in 1994.  She has been nominated a number of times for the Hugo and Nebula awards, winning the Nebula Award for Best Short Story in 1995 and 1996 for, respectively, "Death and the Librarian" and "A Birthday". "A Birthday" was additionally a Hugo Award finalist in 1996. Her short story, "All Vows" was also a finalist for the Nebula in 1994 and took second place in Asimov's SF Magazine Readers' Poll in 1993.

Friesner's Star Trek: Deep Space Nine novel, Warchild, also made the USA TODAY bestseller list.

Nebula Awards and Nominations 

 1993- “All Vows”, published by Asimov’s Magazine, Nominated for Best Short Story
 1995- “Jesus at the Bat” published by The Magazine of Fantasy and Science Fiction, Nominated for Best Novelette 1995
 1995- “Death and the Librarian” published by Asimov’s Magazine, Winner, Best Short story
 1996- “A Birthday” published by The Magazine of Fantasy and Science Fiction, Winner, Best Short Story
 1999- “How to Make Unicorn Pie” published by The Magazine of Fantasy and Science Fiction, Nominated for Best Novelette
 2001- Toastmaster for World Science Fiction Convention 2001
 2006- “Helen Remembers the Stork Club”, published by The Magazine of Fantasy and Science Fiction, Nominated for Best Short Story of 2006

Locus Awards 
 Locus Awards — for SF/F/H works, polled by readers of Locus Magazine (10 nominations)

 2006: “The Fraud” (Asimov's Mar 2005) — novelette — 24th place
 2006: “Last Man Standing” (F&SF Jan 2005) — novelette — 17th place
 2006: “Helen Remembers the Stork Club” (F&SF Oct/Nov 2005) — short story — 15th place
  2000: “How to Make Unicorn Pie” (F&SF Jan 1999) — novelette — 14th place
 1999: “Brown Dust” (Starlight 2) — novelette — 16th place
 1996: “A Birthday” (F&SF Aug 1995) — short story — 4th place
 1996: Chicks in Chainmail (Baen) — anthology — 19th place
 1993: “All Vows” (Asimov's Nov 1992) — short story — 17th place
 1989: Druid's Blood (NAL Signet) — fantasy novel — 13th place
 1987: New York by Knight (Signet) — fantasy novel — 19th place

Other Awards and Nominations 

 James Tiptree Jr Memorial Award — for SF/F that explores and expands the roles of women and men, juried (1 nomination)
 1999: “In the Realms of Dragons” (Asimov's Feb 1998) — long list
 Asimov's Reader Poll — for stories, poems, and art published by Asimov's, polled by readers (4 nominations)
 2001: “The Shunned Trailer” (Asimov's Feb 2000) — short story — 10th place
 1995: “Death and the Librarian” (Asimov's Dec 1994) — short story — 2nd place
 1994: “'White!' Said Fred” (Asimov's Oct 1993) — short story — 3rd place (tie)
 1993: “All Vows” (Asimov's Nov 1992) — short story — 2nd place
 ·Gaylactic Spectrum Awards — for SF/F/H on GLBT themes, voted by members of Gaylactic Network (1 nomination)
 2000: “Chanoyu” (Asimov's Mar 1999) — short fiction — nomination
 HOMer Awards — for SF/F works, voted by members of SF/F forum on CompuServe (2 nominations)
 2000: “Chanoyu” (Asimov's Mar 1999) — novelette — nomination
 2000: “How to Make Unicorn Pie” (F&SF Jan 1999) — novelette — nomination

Bibliography

Novels
 Harlot's Ruse (1986)
 The Silver Mountain (1986)
 Druid's Blood (1988)
 Yesterday We Saw Mermaids (1992)
 Split Heirs (1993) with Lawrence Watt-Evans
 Wishing Season (1993)
 The Sherwood Game (1995)
 Child of the Eagle: A Myth of Rome (1996)
 Playing with Fire (1997)
Knock on Wood (2000)
 E.Godz (2003) with Robert Asprin
 Temping Fate (2006)
 Threads and Flames (2010)

Becca of Wiserways (Psalms) series
 The Psalms Of Herod (1996)
 The Sword Of Mary (1996)

Chronicles of the Twelve Kingdoms series
 Mustapha and His Wise Dog (1985)
 Spells of Mortal Weaving (1986)
 The Witchwood Cradle (1987)
 The Water King's Laughter (1989)

Demons series
 Here Be Demons (1988)
 Demon Blues (1989)
 Hooray For Hellywood (1990)

Gnome Man's Land series
 Gnome Man's Land (1991)
 Harpy High (1991)
 Unicorn U (1992)

Majyk series
 Majyk by Accident (1993)
 Majyk by Hook Or Crook (1994)
 Majyk by Design (1995)

Men in Black novelizations
 Men in Black II (2002)

New York by Knight series
 New York by Knight (1986)
 Elf Defense (1988)
 Sphynxes Wild (1989)

Princesses of Myth series

Helen of Troy
 Nobody's Princess (2007)
 Nobody's Prize (2008)

Nefertiti
 Sphinx's Princess (2009)
 Sphinx's Queen (2010)

Himiko
 Spirit's Princess (2012)
 Spirit's Chosen (2013)

Maeve
 Deception's Princess (2014)
 Deception's Pawn (2015)

Sabrina the Teenage Witch
 #11 Prisoner of Cabin 13
 #22 Witchopoly (1999)

Star Trek universe
 Warchild (1994), #7 in Star Trek: Deep Space Nine series
 To Storm Heaven (1997) #46 in Star Trek: The Next Generation numbered series

Short fiction 
Collections
 It's Been Fun (1991)
 Up The Wall & Other Tales of King Arthur and His Knights (2000)
 Death and the Librarian and Other Stories (2002)
Stories

 "Write When You Get Work" (1983)
 "Godgifu and Aelfgifu" (1983)
 "Simpson's Lesser Sphynx" (1984)
 "But Wait! There's More!" (1984) with Walter J. Stutzman
 "The Jester's Tale" (1985)
 "Primary" (1985)
 "The Death of Nimuë" (1985)
 "The Monk's Tale" (1985)
 "A Friendly Game of Crola" (1985)
 "The Sailor's Bride" (1985)
 "Billingsgate Molly" (1985)
 "Dragonet" (1986)
 "Taverna" (1986)
 "The Old Club Tie" (1986)
 "The Apothecary's Tale" (1986)
 "Honeycomb" (1987)
 "A Winter's Night" (1988)
 "A New Chantey" (1988)
 "An Eye for the Ladies" (1988)
 "Wake-Up Call" (1988)
 "Black Butterflies" (1989)
 "The Houri's Mirror" (1989)
 "Do I Dare to Ask Your Name?" (1989)
 "The Doo-Wop Never Dies: A Christmas Fable" (1989)
 "Poe White Trash" (1989)
 "Articles of Faith" (1990)
 "The Weavers" (1990)
 Cthulhu Mythos series:
 "Love's Eldritch Ichor" (1990) 
 "In the Can" (1990)
 "Sweet, Savage Sorcerer" (1990)
 "Up the Wall" (1990)
 "The Curse of Psamlahkithotep" (1990)
 "Saint Willibald's Dragon" (1990)
 "Whammy" (1990)
 "A Matter of Taste" (1990)
 "Blunderbore" (1990)
 "Mad at the Academy" (1991)
 "Ecce Hominid" (1991)
 "The Shoemaker and the Elves" (1991)
 "The Whiskaway Children and the Big Bang" (1991)
 "Tunnel Vision" (1991)
 "Claim-Jumpin' Woman, You Got A Stake in My Heart" (1991)
 "Pride and Prescience" (1991)
 "A Little Learning" (1991)
 "Told You So" (1992) (collected in Mike Resnick's alternate history anthology Alternate Kennedys)
 "Such a Deal" (1992)
 "Take Me Out to the Ball Game" (1992)
 "Her American Cousin" (1992)
 "Split Heirs" (Excerpt) (1992) with Lawrence Watt-Evans
 "Dead Ringer" (1992) with Walter J. Stutzman
 "All Vows" (1992)
 "Puss" (1993)
 Riverworld series:
 "Legends" (1993)
 "The Blood-Ghoul of Scarsdale" (1993)
 "You Can't Make an Omelet" (1993)
 "Jane's Fighting Ships" (1993) (collected in Mike Resnick's anthology Alternate Warriors)
 "Five-Finger Exercise" (1993)
 "Three Queens" (1993)
 "Sugar Daddy" (1993)
 "Baby Face" (1993)
 "Lowlifes" (1993)
 "One Quiet Day in the Suburbs" (1993)
 "'White!' Said Fred" (1993)
 "The Broad in the Bronze Bra" (1993)
 "Titus!" (1994)
 "Royal Tiff Yields Face of Jesus!" (1994)
 "Bargaining Chip" (1994)
 "It's a Gift" (1994)
 "Two Lovers, Two Gods, and a Fable" (1994)
 "Jesus at the Bat" (1994)
 "A Beltaine and Suspenders" (1994)
 "Patterns" (1994)
 "Death and the Librarian" (1994)
 "In the Garden" (1994)
 "Le Roi S'amuse" (1995)
 "Goldie, Lox, and the Three Excalibearers" (1995)
 "Chance" (1995)
 "Down by the Old Mainstream" (1995)
 "Un tour de cochon" (1995)
 "A Pig's Tale" (1995)
 "A Few Good Menehune" (1995)
 "A Birthday" (1995)
 "The Way to a Man's Heart" (1995)
 "Tea" (1996)
 "And Thereby Hangs" (1996)
 "A Life in the Theatre" (1996)
 "Sparrow" (1996)
 "The Strange Case of Ludwig the Unspeakable" (1996)
 "Moonlight in Vermont" (1996)
 "Death Swatch" (1996)
 "That's Entertainment: The Tale of Salacious Crumb" (1996)
 "Just Wait Until You Have Children of Your Own" (1996)
 "Silent Love" (1997)
 "Lonelyhearts" (1997)
 "King of the Cyber Trifles" (1997)
 "Prey" (1997)
 "Miss Thing" (1997)
 "What Really Killed the Dinosaurs" (1997)
 "No Bigger Than My Thumb" (1997)
 "Give a Man a Horse He Can Ride" (1997)
 "True Believer" (1997)
 "Claim-Jumpin' Woman Got a Stake in My Heart" (1997)
 "Won't You Take Me Dancing?" (1997)
 "Mortal Things" (1997)
 "To Storm Heaven" (Excerpt) (1997)
 "A Big Hand for the Little Lady" (1998)
 "The Littlest Maenad" (1998)
 "Mrs. Lurie and the Rapture" (1998)
 "How It All Began" (1998)
 "Twelve-Steppe Program" (1998)
 "A Hamster of No Importance" (1998) with Walter J. Stutzman
 "Brown Dust" (1998)
 "Ivy" (1998)
 "In the Realm of Dragons" (1998)
 "Totally Camelot" (1998)
 "Chestnut Street" (1998)
 "An Old Man's Summer" (1998) (collected in Harry Turtledove's anthology Alternate Generals)
 "Repro Man" (1999) with Anne Elizabeth Stutzman
 "Love, Crystal and Stone" (1999)
 "Fashion Victim" (1999)
 "How to Make Unicorn Pie" (1999)
 "Jolene's Motel" (1999)
 "Chanoyu" (1999)
 "Case #285B" (1999)
 "Sea-Section" (1999)
 Zoli of the Brazen Shield series:
 "Cross CHILDREN Walk" (1999) aka "Cross Children Walk"
 "Troll by Jury" (2000)
 "Miranda's Muse" (2000)
 "Big Hair" (2000)
 "Hallowmass" (2000)
 "The Shunned Trailer" (2000)
 "Cora" (2000)
 "Gunsel and Gretel" (2001)
 "Auntie Elspeth's Halloween Story, or the Gourd, the Bad and the Ugly" (2001)
 "Werotica" (2001)
 "Came the Dawn" (2001)
 "Ilion" (2002)
 "Labor Relations" (2002) (collected in Harry Turtledove's anthology Alternate Generals II)
 "Men in the Rain" (2002)
 "Grain" (2002)
 "Just Another Cowboy" (2002)
 "In Days of Old" (2002)
 "Why I Want to Come to Brewer College" (2002)
 "Homework" (2002)
 "I Killed Them in Vegas" (2003)
 "Giants in the Earth" (2004)
 "Au Purr" (2004)
 "The Dead Don't Waddle" (2004)
 "Johnny Beansprout" (2004)
 "Child's Play" (2004)
 "Last Man Standing" (2005)
 "Marriage a la Modred" (2005)
 "The Fraud" (2005)
 "Cook's Turing" (2005)
 "The Beau and the Beast" (2005)
 "First, Catch Your Elephant" (2005) (collected in Harry Turtledove's anthology Alternate Generals III)
 "One for the Record" (2005)
 "Helen Remembers The Stork Club" (2005)
 "Thunderbolt" (2005)
 "Abductio Ad Absurdum" (2006)
 "The Really Big Sleep" (2006)
 "An Autumn Butterfly" (2006)
 "Benny Comes Home" (2006)
 "Cubby Grumbles Makes a Change" (2006)
 "Crumbs" (2006)
 "The Wedding of Wylda Serene" (2006)
 "If Looks Could Kill" (2007)
 "Seeking the Master" (2007)
 "A Sacred Institution" (2007)
 "At These Prices" (2007)
 "Roomies" (2007)
 "The Bones of Mammoth Malone" (2007)
 "Stocks and Bondage" (2007)
 "Edra's Arrow" (2007)
 "A Rosé for Emily" (2007)
 "Home for the Holidays" (2008)
 "In a Dark Wood, Dreaming" (2008)
 "How Thorvald the Bloody-Minded Saved Christmas" (2008)
 "The Face Is Familiar" (2008)
 "You Got Served" (2008)
 "Mummy Knows Best" (2008)
 "Gut Feeling" (2008)
 "Isn't That Special" (2009)
 "No Children, No Pets" (2010)
 "Long in the Tooth" (2010)
 "The One That Got Away" (2011)
 "Rutger and Baby Do Jotenheim" (2011)
 "Dance with the Devil" (2012)

Anthologies (edited)
Chicks in Chainmail series
 Chicks in Chainmail (1995)
 Did You Say Chicks?! (1998)
 Chicks 'n Chained Males (1999)
 The Chick is in the Mail (2000)
 Turn the Other Chick (2004)
 Chicks and Balances (2015)
 Chicks Ahoy! (2010) Omnibus of first three volumes
Supernatural Suburbia series
 Witch Way to the Mall (2009)
 Strip Mauled (2009)
 Fangs for the Mammaries (2010)

Alien Pregnant By Elvis (1994 with Martin H. Greenberg)

Blood Muse (1995 with Martin H. Greenberg)

Poems 
 "The Shield-Maiden's Honeymoon" (1984)
 "Chivalry" (1985)
 "A Gaming Son" (1985)
 "The Vampire of Gretna Green" (1985)
 "A Short Slew of SF Clerihews" (1986)
 "More SF Clerihews" (1986)
 "Yet More SF Clerihews" (1986)
 "The Sincere Symbiote" (1986)
 "Spell for a Nuclear Witch" (1988)
 "Who Made the Stew on Betelgeuse II?" (1988)
 "Cat-Tech-Ism" (1988)
 "Food for Thought" (1989)
 "Confessio" (1989)
 "The Hobbyist" (1989)
 "Lovers" (1994)
 "For Sale: One Moonbase, Never Used" (2009)

Essays 

 Letter (Locus #307) (1986) with S. P. Somtow and Sharon Webb 
 Letter (Science Fiction Chronicle #85) (1986) with S. P. Somtow and Sharon Webb 
 Regrets Only (1986)
 The Other Side: Now Revealed: Money-Making     Secrets of the Shockmeisters (1987)
 Letter (Locus #326) (1988)
 About the Authors (Arabesques) (1988) with M. J. Engh and William R. Forstchen and Tanith Lee and Sandra Miesel and Larry Niven and Andre Norton and Elizabeth Ann Scarborough and Melissa Scott and Susan Shwartz and Nancy Springer and Judith Tarr and Harry Turtledove and Gene Wolfe and Jane Yolen 
 Letter (Locus #331) (1988)
 Read This (NYRSF, November 1988) (1988)
 Who Was That Alien I Saw You With Last Night? (1990)
 Introduction (It's Been Fun) (1991)
 Ask Auntie Esther (Pulphouse, October 25, 1991) (1991)
 Ask Auntie Esther (Pulphouse, November 29, 1991) (1991)
 Ask Auntie Esther (Pulphouse, December 31, 1991) (1991)
 Ask Auntie Esther (Pulphouse, July 1992) (1992)
 Ask Auntie Esther (Pulphouse, September–October     1992) (1992)
 Ask Auntie Esther (Pulphouse #15) (1993)
 Ask Auntie Esther (Pulphouse #17, 1994) (1994)
 Introduction: Alien Pregnant by Elvis (1994)
 Chicks in Chainmail (introduction) (1995)
 There's nothing funny about mixing humor and SF (1995)
 Introduction (Blood Muse) (1995)
 Take My Wizard...Please! The Serious Business of Writing Funny Fantasy and Science Fiction (1996)
 The Old School Spirit (1997)
 Introduction (Did You Say Chicks?) (1998)
 But What I Really Want to Do Is Direct (1998)
 Introduction (Chicks 'n Chained Males) (1999)
 Introduction (The Chick is in the Mail) (2000) only appeared as:
 Variant: Introduction (The Chick Is in the Mail) (2000)
 If You Give a Girl a Hobbit (2001) also appeared as:
 Translation: Wennein Mädel an einen Hobbit gerät [German] (2002)
 Translation: Hobbits et jeune filles en fleur [French] (2003)
 Introduction (Death and the Librarian and Other Stories) (2002)
 Introduction to "The Stuff of Heroes" (2003)
 Terry Pratchett: The Man, The Myth, The Legend, The Beverage (2004)
 Give Beast a Chance (2005)
 About the Authors (Turn the Other Chick) (2006)
 Introduction (Turn the Other Chick) (2006)
 On "Helen Remembers the Stork Club" (2007)
 Introduction (Witch Way to the Mall) (2009)
 Leader of the Pack (2009)
 Introduction (Fangs for the Mammaries) (2010)
 On Judy and Darkover (2013)
 Introduction (Bard's Road: The Collected Fiction of Lee Martindale) (2014)
 Introduction (Chicks and Balances) (2015)

References

External links

 Author homepage

1951 births
Living people
20th-century American novelists
20th-century American women writers
21st-century American novelists
21st-century American women writers
American fantasy writers
American science fiction writers
American speculative fiction editors
American women novelists
Hunter College High School alumni
The Magazine of Fantasy & Science Fiction people
Nebula Award winners
Novelists from Connecticut
Novelists from New York (state)
Science fiction editors
Vassar College alumni
Women science fiction and fantasy writers
Writers from New York City
Yale University faculty
American women academics
Jewish American writers